Killruddery House (also spelled "Kilruddery") is a large country house on the southern outskirts of Bray in County Wicklow, Ireland, approximately  south of Dublin. The present structure is a south facing multi-bay mansion, originally dating from the 17th century, but remodelled and extended in 1820 in the Elizabethan style. It is constructed as variously single, two, three and four storeys in the shape of an irregular quadrangle enclosing a courtyard. To the north an office wing incorporates the 17th-century portion and to the south and west is a large domed conservatory, the orangery, designed by William Burn in about the 1850s. The house sits within a large landscaped demesne which features a pair of 550-foot long parallel reflecting pools on the south lawn.

History

In 1534, Sir William Brabazon of Leicestershire was posted to Ireland to serve as Vice-Treasurer. Later, in 1539, after vigorously supporting King Henry VIII's efforts to break with Rome and the Dissolution of the Monasteries, Brabazon secured the ownership of the Abbey of St. Thomas, Dublin, whose lands included Killruddery.

In 1618, the land was granted to his great-grandson, also William Brabazon (c.1580-1651) who was made the 1st Earl of Meath in 1627. The 2nd Earl of Meath (1610–1675) built a new house at Killruddery in 1651 to replace one burned down in the civil war six years earlier. Contemporary pictures show an East-facing building of five bays.

John Brabazon, 10th Earl of Meath, carried out an extensive reconstruction of the house between 1820 and 1830. Architects Sir Richard Morrison and his son William Vitruvius Morrison were commissioned to build a Tudor Revival mansion incorporating the original 17th century mansion. The result was a large building, featuring a North-facing entrance with a cupola, behind which clustered a number of wings forming an irregular quadrangle around a central courtyard. The interior of the house originally featured elaborate chimney-pieces by Giacinto Micali, crimson silk damask from Spitalfields, stained glass by John Milner, a domed ceiling by Henry Popje and a drawing room ceiling by Simon Gilligan. A clock tower in the forecourt houses a water clock designed and constructed by Reginald Brabazon, 13th Earl of Meath, with a pendulum powered by a jet of water.

From 1952 to 1962, the house underwent a reconstruction, due to severe dry rot. Builders carefully demolished the façade, numbering each brick, and rebuilt a new entrance. A few sections of the house, including the original grand entrance and dome were lost, and the house was remodeled by Claud Phillimore (who succeeded, in 1990, as Baron Phillimore).

Modern times

The estate is owned and occupied by the 15th Earl and Countess of Meath — John Anthony Brabazon and his wife Xenia. As of 2016, their son Anthony Brabazon and his wife Fionnuala (Lord and Lady Ardee) manage the house, gardens and farm, and also live in the house along with their four children.

The property is managed as a working farm with a variety of enterprises to earn the funds to maintain the estate and provide a living. The owners operate tours, events, sports, horse riding, festivals, concerts, filming location rentals, farmers market, cafe, and weddings. The working farms produces food for the events and café with the goal being "100% farm-to-fork".

The estate has been used as a filming location for a number of films and television mini-series including My Left Foot, Far and Away, Angela's Ashes, Camelot and The Tudors. Into the Badlands, The Turning, and Fate: The Winx Saga were also partially filmed there.

Killruddery's gardens are also home to the annual Groove Festival.

Gardens

At the foot of the Little Sugar Loaf mountain, the estate has over 800 acres. In 1684, Monsieur Bonet was hired to build the gardens inspired by the then-popular French Gardens of Versailles. The idea for the two 550-foot long reflecting pools came from the canals at Château de Courances, and stocked fish for the house. Also constructed during the 4th Earl's ownership was a summer house, pleasure garden, cherry garden, kitchen garden, gravel walks, a bowling green, a walled garden with fruit trees, a ha-ha, avenues, ponds, formal hedges, and a deer park.

In 1846, Daniel Robertson restored the gardens for the 11th Earl. A conservatory was built, designed by William Burn in the 1850s.

In 1951, the 14th Earl and Countess of Meath returned to the property and were faced with dry rot on the buildings and overgrown gardens. Without a gardener for many years, they gradually working to restore the gardens themselves. They opened the house and gardens to the public.

As of 2002, there were over 90 acres of gardens with 3.5 miles of hedging.

References

External links

 
 Tales From The Big House with David Norris, Episode 4 - Killruddery (2002) (Youtube)

1651 establishments in Ireland
Houses completed in 1651
Buildings and structures in Bray, County Wicklow
Country houses in Ireland